is a Japanese male curler.

Teams

References

External links

Video: 

Living people
1980 births
Japanese male curlers